Giannis Sina Ugo Antetokounmpo (born Adetokunbo; December 6, 1994) is a Greek-Nigerian professional basketball player for the Milwaukee Bucks of the National Basketball Association (NBA). Antetokounmpo's country of origin, in addition to his size, speed, strength, and ball-handling skills have earned him the nickname "Greek Freak". Antetokounmpo is widely regarded as one of the greatest power forwards of all time and one of the greatest European players of all time.

Born and raised in Athens to Nigerian parents, Antetokounmpo began playing basketball for the youth teams of Filathlitikos in Athens. In 2011, he began playing for the club's senior team before entering the 2013 NBA draft, where he was selected 15th overall by the Bucks. In 2016–17 he led the Bucks in all five major statistical categories and became the first player in NBA history to finish a regular season in the top 20 in all five statistics of total points, rebounds, assists, steals, and blocks. He received the Most Improved Player award in 2017. Antetokounmpo has received seven All-Star selections, including being selected as an All-Star captain in 2019, 2020 and 2023 as he led the Eastern Conference in voting in these three years.

One of the most decorated players in NBA history, Antetokounmpo won consecutive NBA Most Valuable Player Awards in 2019 and 2020, joining Kareem Abdul-Jabbar and LeBron James as the only players in NBA history to win two MVPs before turning 26. Along with his MVP award, he was also named the NBA Defensive Player of the Year in 2020, becoming only the third player after Michael Jordan (1988) and Hakeem Olajuwon (1994) to win both awards in the same season. In 2021, Antetokounmpo led the Bucks to their first NBA championship since 1971 and was named Finals MVP. The same year, he was honored as one of the league's greatest players of all-time by being named to the NBA 75th Anniversary Team.

The biopic Rise, based on the life of Antetokounmpo and his family, was released in 2022.

Early life
Giannis Sina Ugo Adetokunbo was born in Athens, Greece, on December 6, 1994, the son of immigrants from Nigeria. His father had been a soccer player in Nigeria, while his mother was a high jumper. Three years earlier, they had moved from Lagos, leaving their firstborn son, Francis, under the care of his grandparents. Adetokunbo grew up in the Athens neighborhood of Sepolia, and described his home as a "Nigerian home" with "no Greek culture. It’s straight-up Nigerian culture." His parents, as immigrants without work permits, could not easily find work, so Giannis and his older brother Thanasis helped by hawking watches, handbags, and sunglasses in the streets. In 2007, Adetokunbo started playing basketball.

Although Adetokunbo and three of his four brothers were born in Greece, they did not automatically receive Greek citizenship as Greek nationality law follows jus sanguinis. People deemed him an outsider. He said that he was considered "not Greek enough" because of his parents' heritage and his different skin color, while Nigerians in the African neighborhoods of Greece criticized him for not understanding either the Yoruba or Igbo languages. For the first 18 years of his life, Adetokunbo could not travel outside the country and was effectively stateless, having no papers from Greece or Nigeria. He was eventually issued Greek citizenship on May 9, 2013, less than two months before the 2013 NBA Draft.

After gaining Greek citizenship in 2013, his official surname became Αντετοκούνμπο, the Greek transcription of Adetokunbo, which was then transliterated letter-for-letter and officially spelled on his Greek passport as Antetokounmpo. Giannis is the colloquial for the Gr. Ioannis (John). Because many could not pronounce his surname, he quickly became known as the "Greek Freak". Antetokounmpo also holds Nigerian citizenship, having received his Nigerian passport in 2015, and as such possesses dual citizenship. He has stated that he feels both Greek and Nigerian, telling many that he is African and "not just 'The Greek Freak'".

Professional career

Filathlitikos (2011–2013)
In 2011, Antetokounmpo played with the senior men's team of Filathlitikos in the semi-pro Greek B Basket League (Third Division) during the 2011–12 season.

In December 2012, a few days after turning 18, Antetokounmpo signed a four-year deal with Spanish club CAI Zaragoza, reportedly including NBA buyouts after each season. Several of other major European clubs had been interested in adding him, including Barcelona and Anadolu Efes.

During the 2012–13 Greek A2 League season, Antetokounmpo shot 46.4% from the field (62.1% on two-point field goals), 31.3% from three-point range, and 72.0% from the free throw line, while averaging 22.5 minutes per game. Over 26 games, he averaged 9.5 points, 5.0 rebounds, 1.4 assists, and 1.0 blocks per game. He was also selected by the coaches as a special participant in the 2013 Greek League All-Star Game. Even though he was not selected as an all-star, the coaches let him play in the game as a treat for the fans.

Milwaukee Bucks (2013–present)

Early years in Milwaukee (2013–2016)

On April 28, 2013, Antetokounmpo officially made himself eligible for the 2013 NBA draft. He fulfilled his draft projections as a first-round pick by being selected 15th overall by the Milwaukee Bucks. On July 30, 2013, he signed his rookie scale contract with the Bucks.

He averaged 6.8 points, 4.4 rebounds, 1.9 assists, 0.8 steals, and 0.8 blocks in 77 appearances during his rookie season. He scored in double figures 23 times and grabbed at least 10 rebounds twice, with both efforts resulting in double-doubles. He finished the season with 61 total blocks, which led all NBA rookies, and was the seventh-most by a Bucks rookie in franchise history. He was selected to participate in the Rising Stars Challenge at NBA All-Star Weekend in New Orleans, where he tallied nine points, two rebounds, and two assists in 17 minutes. At the season's end, he was named to the 2013–14 NBA All-Rookie second team.

Antetokounmpo's second season with the Bucks saw both individual and team development. On February 6, 2015, he recorded a then career-high 27 points and 15 rebounds in a loss to the Houston Rockets. Three days later, he was named the Eastern Conference Player of the Week for games played February 2–8, earning Player of the Week honors for the first time in his career. He later competed in the 2015 NBA Slam Dunk Contest at NBA All-Star Weekend in New York. On March 9, he scored a then career-high 29 points on 11-of-16 shooting in a loss to the New Orleans Pelicans.

In the 2015–16 season, Antetokounmpo developed further individually, upping his scoring average to almost 17 points per game. On November 19, he scored a then career-high 33 points in a loss to the Cleveland Cavaliers. On December 12, he recorded a near triple-double with 11 points, 12 rebounds, and 8 assists, helping the Bucks snap the Golden State Warriors' 24-game unbeaten start to the season with a 108–95 win. On February 22, 2016, Antetokounmpo recorded his first career triple-double with 27 points, 12 rebounds, and 10 assists in a 108–101 win over the Los Angeles Lakers. At 21 years old, he became the youngest Buck to record a triple-double.

First All-Star years (2016–2018)

On September 19, 2016, Antetokounmpo agreed to a four-year, $100 million contract extension with the Bucks. Antetokounmpo's fourth year with the Bucks would be his breakout season, as he further increased his statistical output and ascended to stardom. On December 23, he had a then career-high 39 points, eight rebounds, and six assists in a 123–96 win over the Washington Wizards. A couple of weeks later, Antetokounmpo recorded 27 points and 13 rebounds and made his first game-winning buzzer-beater, a 15-foot turnaround jumper which gave the Bucks a 105–104 victory over the New York Knicks. With 25 points against the Knicks on January 6, Antetokounmpo had at least 20 points in his 14th consecutive game, matching the longest streak by a Bucks player since Michael Redd in 2006. On January 19, Antetokounmpo was named a starter on the Eastern Conference All-Star team for the 2017 NBA All-Star Game. At 22 years and 74 days old, he became the youngest player in franchise history to start in an All-Star Game. He also became the first Greek NBA All-Star. In the game, he led the East with 30 points in a 192–182 loss to the West. On April 3, 2017, he was named Eastern Conference Player of the Month for games played in March. The award was the first of Antetokounmpo's career and the first for a Buck since Michael Redd won the award in January 2004. Antetokounmpo helped the Bucks finish an Eastern Conference-best 14–4 in March, the franchise's first calendar month with at least 14 victories since going 16–2 in February 1971. Antetokounmpo led the Bucks in every one of the five major statistical categories (points, rebounds, assists, steals, and blocks) in the 2016–17 regular season, becoming only the fifth NBA player to do so after Dave Cowens, Scottie Pippen, Kevin Garnett, and LeBron James; Nikola Jokić have since matched it. He also became the first player in NBA history to finish in the top 20 in the league in each of the five major categories in a regular season. As a result of his efforts, Antetokounmpo was named to the All-NBA Second Team, earning his first All-NBA honor. He was also named the recipient of the NBA Most Improved Player Award for the 2016–17 season, becoming the first player in Bucks history to be named Most Improved Player.

On April 15, 2017, Antetokounmpo scored a playoff career-high 28 points in a 97–83 win over the third-seed Toronto Raptors in Game 1 of their first-round playoff series. In Game 5 of the series on April 24, Antetokounmpo set a new playoff career-high with 30 points, but could not lead the Bucks to a win as they lost 118–93 to go down 3–2 in the series. The Bucks went on to lose Game 6 three days later despite a 34-point effort from Antetokounmpo, ending their season.

Antetokounmpo began the 2017–18 season on a tear, scoring 175 points over the first five games of the season, including a then career-high 44 points in a 113–110 win over the Portland Trail Blazers. He averaged almost 27 points during the season, earning his second straight All-Star nomination and All-NBA selection, and broke Kareem Abdul Jabbar's franchise record for triple-doubles.

In Game 1 of the Bucks' first-round playoff series against the Boston Celtics, Antetokounmpo recorded 35 points, 13 rebounds and seven assists in a 113–107 overtime loss. Antetokounmpo's game-winning tip-in in Game 4 equalized the series at two games a piece. However, the Celtics would go on to eliminate the Bucks in seven games, in spite of Antetokounmpo's 22 points and nine rebounds in Game 7.

Back-to-back MVP and DPOY award (2018–2020)
Starting from the 2018–19 season, Antetokounmpo and the Bucks achieved a period of sustained team success. Under new coach Mike Budenholzer, the Bucks began the season with seven consecutive victories and went 25–10 before the New Year.

Antetokounmpo was critical to this early success, earning the Eastern Conference Player of the Month awards for October, November, December and February. On March 17, Antetokounmpo scored a then career-high 52 points to go with 16 rebounds in a 130–125 loss to the 76ers. He avenged this loss in an April 4 victory where he recorded 45 points and 13 rebounds in a 128–122 win over the 76ers, helping the Bucks clinch the No. 1 seed in the Eastern Conference. Antetokounmpo eventually guided the Bucks to a 60–22 season and the best record in the league. He helped the Bucks advance to the second round of the playoffs for the first time since 2001 after scoring 41 points in a 127–104 win in Game 4 over the Detroit Pistons for a four-game sweep. The Bucks went on to reach the Eastern Conference Finals, where they were defeated 4–2 by the eventual champions, the Toronto Raptors, despite winning the first two games. At the 2019 NBA Awards end-of-season night, Antetokounmpo was named the league's Most Valuable Player. He joined Kareem Abdul-Jabbar as the second Bucks player to win MVP and became the third youngest player to win the MVP over the previous 40 seasons, behind Derrick Rose and LeBron James.

Antetokounmpo began the 2019–20 season with a triple-double, recording 30 points, 13 rebounds, and 11 assists in a 117–111 season-opening win over the Houston Rockets on October 24, 2019. On November 25, Antetokounmpo scored a season-high 50 points, along with 14 rebounds, in a 122–118 win over the Utah Jazz. After a December 14 victory over the Cleveland Cavaliers, Antetokounmpo had led the Bucks to their 18th straight victory, 2 shy of the franchise record. The winning streak ended on December 16 with a close loss to the Dallas Mavericks, despite of Antetokounmpo recording an efficient 48 points and 14 rebounds. On December 19, Antetokounmpo made a career-high five three-pointers to lead Milwaukee over the Western top seed, the Los Angeles Lakers and helped the Bucks claim the NBA's best record at 25–4. On January 23, 2020, Antetokounmpo was named an All-Star Game captain, alongside James, for the second consecutive year.

During the season postponement that lasted from early March to the end of July, due to the COVID-19 pandemic, Antetokounmpo claimed to not have a basketball hoop to practice with. He later clarified that he did have access to a gym and basketball hoop, explaining his earlier comments as a means to "get a little bit ahead of the competition." Antetokounmpo and the Bucks resumed their campaign against the Boston Celtics on July 31, where Antetokounmpo led the Bucks to victory with 36 points and 15 rebounds. Although the Bucks finished the seeding games with a 3–5 record, they set the best record in the NBA for the second consecutive year, finishing with a 56–17 record. On August 12, Antetokounmpo was suspended for one game without pay for headbutting Moritz Wagner during a game against the Washington Wizards. Antetokounmpo finished the season with an all-time record for single-season NBA Player Efficiency Rating (PER) with 31.9, as per Basketball Reference, having surpassed the previous record held by Wilt Chamberlain of 31.82. During the playoffs, the Bucks advanced to the second round but lost 4–1 to the Miami Heat. In Game 2, the Heat's Jimmy Butler was fouled while shooting by Antetokounmpo as time expired, leading to Butler's game-winning walk-off free throws. Antetokounmpo missed most of Game 4 after re-injuring his right ankle which he twisted in Game 3. Milwaukee won the game, but Antetokounmpo was also out for Game 5, when the Bucks were eliminated.

On September 18, 2020, Antetokounmpo won his second consecutive Most Valuable Player award. In doing so, he joined Hakeem Olajuwon and Michael Jordan as the only players to win MVP and NBA Defensive Player of the Year awards in the same season.

NBA championship and Finals MVP (2020–2021)
On December 15, 2020, Antetokounmpo re-signed with the Bucks, coming to terms on a 5-year, $228 million extension, the largest in league history. At the 2021 All-Star Game, he played on the team captained by James and scored 35 points on a perfect 16-of-16 shooting from the field to lead the team to a 170–150 win and became the first non-American to win the All-Star MVP. The Bucks finished the 2020–21 season with a 46–26 record, clinching the third seed in the Eastern Conference. In the first round of the playoffs, they faced a rematch against the Miami Heat. In a stark reversal of their upset loss the prior year, Antetokounmpo led the Bucks to a four-game sweep, closing out the series with his first playoff triple-double in Game 4. Antetokounmpo also led the Bucks to a seven-game series win over the Brooklyn Nets in the Eastern Conference Semifinals, where Antetokounmpo averaged 31.9 points, 12.9 rebounds, and 3.6 assists per game. On June 29, 2021, Antetokounmpo suffered an injury to his left knee during the third quarter of Game 4 of the Eastern Conference Finals against the Atlanta Hawks after slamming into Clint Capela and landing awkwardly, resulting in a gruesome hyperextension. Antetokounmpo would not return to the game, and the Bucks lost 110–88. MRI results would later show that he did not suffer any ligament tears. Antetokounmpo was ruled out for both Games 5 and 6 of the Eastern Conference Finals as a result of the knee injury. The series returned to Milwaukee at a 2–2 deadlock, yet the Bucks ended up winning both Games 5 and 6 in his absence, advancing to the NBA Finals for the first time in 47 years.

Antetokounmpo returned in time for the finals against the resurgent Phoenix Suns. In his Finals debut, he recorded 20 points and 17 rebounds in a 118–108 loss. He then registered back-to-back games with at least 40 points and 10 rebounds in a Game 2 loss and a Game 3 victory, joining Shaquille O'Neal in 2000 as the only players to reach those numbers in consecutive Finals games. He also joined Jordan, O'Neal, and James as the only players to put up at least 40 points in back-to-back Finals games in the previous 50 years. The Bucks continued their comeback after having lost the first two games of the series, prevailing in the next four contests. In Game 6, Antetokounmpo recorded 50 points, 14 rebounds and 5 blocks as the Bucks clinched their first championship in 50 years. He posted series averages of 35.2 points, 13.2 rebounds, 5.0 assists, 1.2 steals, and 1.8 blocks, and was subsequently named NBA Finals MVP by a unanimous vote. At  old, he is the youngest since Kawhi Leonard in 2014 to be named Finals MVP, as well as the first European since Dirk Nowitzki in 2011 to do so. Antetokounmpo also joined Michael Jordan and Hakeem Olajuwon as the only players to have won the MVP, Finals MVP, and Defensive Player of the Year awards during the span of their careers.

Breaking franchise records and coming up short (2021–2022) 
On October 19, 2021, after receiving his first NBA championship ring in the annual pre-game ceremony, Antetokounmpo recorded 32 points, 14 rebounds, and seven assists in a 127–104 season-opening win over the Nets. On January 13, 2022, Antetokounmpo led the Bucks to a 118–99 win over the Golden State Warriors with 30 points, 12 rebounds, 11 assists, and 3 blocks, leading both teams in such stats, in less than thirty minutes, and became the first player to record multiple 30-point triple-doubles in 30 minutes; he tied Jordan's career mark of 28 triple-doubles, ranking 18th all-time. On February 6, in a 137–113 win over the Los Angeles Clippers, Antetokounmpo recorded 28 points, 10 rebounds, and five assists, as the Bucks became the first team in NBA history to see their entire starting lineup recorded at least 15 points, five rebounds, and two three-pointers in the same game. On February 8, 2022, in a 131–116 win against the Lakers, Antetokounmpo scored 44 points with 14 rebounds, 8 assists, 2 blocks, and 0 turnovers on 17-of-20 shooting from the field; it was his 20 straight game recording at least 25 points. On February 15, Antetokounmpo scored a season-high 50 points and grabbed 14 rebounds on 17-of-21 shooting from the field in a 128–119 win against the Indiana Pacers; it marked only the 12th time in NBA history that a player has scored 50 or more points on 80% shooting or better. On March 29, Antetokounmpo scored 40 points, grabbed 14 rebounds, delivered six assists, and had a game-deciding block on Joel Embiid in the final seconds to lead the Bucks to a 118–116 victory over the Philadelphia 76ers. The following game, Antetokounmpo scored 44 points, grabbed 14 rebounds, and dished out 6 assists in a 120–119 overtime win over the Brooklyn Nets. He passed Kareem Abdul-Jabbar to become the career-leading scorer in Bucks franchise history. Antetokounmpo's record-setting 3-pointer forced overtime, and he made two free throws in the final seconds to seal the victory for the Bucks. Antetokounmpo finished the regular season with a career-high 29.9 points, 11.6 rebounds, and 5.8 assists to become the first player in NBA history to average 25 points or more, 10-plus rebounds, and five assists or more in four separate seasons.

On April 20, during Game 2 of the first round of the playoffs, Antetokounmpo logged 33 points, 18 rebounds, 9 assists, and 2 blocks in a 114–110 loss against the Chicago Bulls. He surpassed Kareem Abdul-Jabbar for the most playoff points in Bucks franchise history. On 1 May, in Game 1 of the Eastern Conference Semifinals, Antetokounmpo recorded his second career playoff triple-double with 24 points, 13 rebounds, and 12 assists in a 101–89 win over the Boston Celtics. He became the first player in franchise history with multiple career playoff triple-doubles On May 13, Antetokounmpo posted 44 points, 20 rebounds, and 6 assists in a 108–95 Game 6 loss. He joined Shaquille O’Neal and Wilt Chamberlain as the only players in NBA playoff history to post a 40/20/5 game. The Bucks would go on to lose to Celtics in Game 7 despite Antetokounmpo’s 25-point, 20-rebound, and 9-assist outing. He became the first player in NBA history to have 200 points, 100 rebounds, and 50 assists in a playoff series, averaging 33.9 points, 14.7 rebounds, and 7.1 assists against Boston. Antetokounmpo also finished the postseason by averaging 31.7 points, 14.2 rebounds and 6.8 assists across the 12 playoff games his Milwaukee Bucks played. He is therefore the first player in NBA history to average a 31-14-6 line across an entire postseason.

On May 21, Antetokounmpo was selected to his fourth consecutive NBA All-Defensive First Team, which was the fifth career all-defensive team selection for him. It tied him with Hall of Famer and former two-time NBA Defensive Player of the Year Award winner Sidney Moncrief for most selections in franchise history. On May 24, Antetokounmpo was selected to his fourth consecutive All-NBA First Team and sixth consecutive overall. He became the first player in club history to earn six All-NBA team honors, passing Kareem Abdul-Jabbar and Sidney Moncrief for the most in franchise history.

Career high in scoring (2022–present) 
On October 22, in the second game of the 2022–23 season, Antetokounmpo recorded 44 points and 12 rebounds on 17-of-21 shooting from the field, playing less than 28 minutes in a 125–105 win over the Houston Rockets; marking just the fifth time in NBA history a player had scored at least 44 points while playing less than 28 minutes. He went 8 of 13 from the foul line to increase his total to 3,508 free throws eclipsing Sidney Moncrief, who made 3,505 free throws with the Bucks, to become the franchise career free throws leader. In the very next game, Antetokounmpo had 43 points, 14 rebounds, 5 assists and 3 blocks in a 110–99 win against the Brooklyn Nets; 34 of his points came in the second half as the Bucks turned a 12-point deficit at halftime into an 11-point victory. On November 4, Antetokounmpo recorded his 30th career triple-double with 26 points, 14 rebounds and 11 assists in a 115–102 win over the Minnesota Timberwolves to improve to 8–0, the best start to a season in Milwaukee Bucks franchise history. On December 28, Antetokounmpo scored 45 points, grabbed a career-high 22 rebounds and delivered 7 assists in an 119–113 overtime loss to the Chicago Bulls. The next game, Antetokounmpo had 43 points along with 20 rebounds and 5 assists in a 123–114 win over the Minnesota Timberwolves.  He joined Wilt Chamberlain and Elgin Baylor as the only players in NBA history with back-to-back games of at least 40 points, 20 rebounds and 5 assists. Antetokounmpo also became just the seventh player with multiple games of 40 points, 20 rebounds, 5 assists and 60% shooting. Since the NBA–ABA Merger in 1976–77 season, Charles Barkley and Antetokounmpo are the only players to do this multiple times. 

On January 3, 2023, Antetokounmpo recorded a career-high 55 points, alongside 10 rebounds and seven assists in a 123–113 win over the Washington Wizards. The next night, Antetokounmpo posted his 31st career triple-double with 30 points, 21 rebounds and 10 assists in a 104–101 overtime win against the Toronto Raptors. He tied John Havlicek and Draymond Green for 15th place on the NBA’s all-time triple-double list. Antetokounmpo also became the first player to total 200+ points, 80+ rebounds, and 30+ assists over a 5-game span since Kareem Abdul-Jabbar in 1972. On January 23, Antetokounmpo was named the Eastern Conference captain for the 2023 NBA All-Star Game, which marked his seventh overall selection. On January 29, Antetokounmpo posted 50 points and 13 rebounds while playing only 30 minutes  in a 135–110 win over New Orleans Pelicans. He shot 20-of-26 from the field, 3-of-4 from three, 7-of-12 from the free throw line. This marked the 10th time this season that Antetokounmpo has scored at least 40 points, matching the career high he set last year for 40-point games in a single season. On February 2, Antetokounmpo scored 20 of his 54 points in the fourth quarter, along with 19 rebounds and the Milwaukee Bucks overcame a 21-point deficit to beat the Los Angeles Clippers 106–105 for their sixth consecutive victory. He joined Kareem Abdul-Jabbar as the only players in Bucks history to have at least three 50-point games in a season. The next game, Antetokounmpo logged his 32nd career triple-double with 35 points, 15 rebounds and 11 assists in a 123–115 win over the Miami Heat. On February 16, Antetokounmpo surpassed Paul Pressey for the most assists in Bucks franchise history.

National team career

Junior national team
Antetokounmpo represented Greece for the first time in July 2013 with the Greek Under-20 national team at the 2013 FIBA Europe Under-20 Championship. He helped Greece to an 8–2 record and a fifth place overall finish, while averaging 8.0 points, 7.6 rebounds, and 2.2 assists across the 10 games. He finished the tournament ranked second in defensive rebounds (7.0) and seventh in blocked shots (1.4).

Senior national team
In 2014, Antetokounmpo played for the senior men's Greek national basketball team for the first time, helping Greece finish ninth overall in the 2014 FIBA Basketball World Cup with a 5–1 record. He averaged 6.3 points and 4.3 rebounds across the six games, while shooting 45.8% from the field.

Antetokounmpo again joined the Greek national team for EuroBasket 2015. Greece's roster consisted of many experienced players, most of them previously crowned European champions with their clubs, like Vassilis Spanoulis, Ioannis Bourousis and Nikos Zisis, and Greece was a favorite for a medal, after showing great form in friendly games. At EuroBasket 2015, Greece was unbeaten in the group stages, and reached the quarter-finals, where a tight game ended in favor of the eventual champions, Spain, eventually finishing fifth with a 7–1 record. Antetokounmpo finished the tournament with three double-doubles, and a career-high 17 rebounds against Spain, leading his team in rebounds for the tournament. In eight games, he averaged 9.8 points, 6.9 rebounds and 1.1 assists per game.

Antetokounmpo also played with Greece at the 2016 Turin FIBA World Olympic Qualifying Tournament, where he averaged 15.3 points, 5.7 rebounds, 2.0 assists, 0.7 steals, and 2.0 blocks per game in 3 games played. Greece failed to qualify for the 2016 Summer Olympics, after being eliminated by Croatia, by a score of 66–61. He also played with Greece during their preparation phase for the EuroBasket 2017. He scored 20 points in a prep game against Montenegro. However, he missed the actual EuroBasket 2017 tournament, due to a knee injury.

Antetokounmpo represented Greece at the 2019 FIBA Basketball World Cup, where he became the first reigning NBA MVP to play in a World Cup. He averaged 14.8 points, 8.8 rebounds, 2.4 assists, 2.4 steals, and 0.6 blocks per game, in 5 games played. Greece finished 11th in the tournament after they failed to advance past the second round, which was regarded as a disappointing result in national and international sports media.

He rejoined the team in August 2022. On August 25, 2022, Antetokounmpo scored a national team career-high 40 points, along with 8 rebounds and 5 assists, in a 94–100 overtime loss to Serbia in the 2023 World Cup qualifiers.

In September, Antetokounmpo played in the EuroBasket 2022 with Greece, his second of such tournament. On September 6, Antetokounmpo scored 41 points in a 99–79 group stage win over Ukraine. This was the twelfth-highest points tally of all-time, and the most points scored in a EuroBasket game since Dirk Nowitzki in 2001. Greece was eliminated by Germany in the quarter-finals, in a game in which Antetokounmpo had 31 points, 7 rebounds and 8 assists but was ejected after two unsportsmanlike fouls. He averaged 29.3 points, 8.8 rebounds, 4.7 assists, 1.5 steals and 0.8 blocks per game in 6 games played, while shooting 56.6% from the field. Antetokounmpo finished the tournament as the leading scorer and was selected to the All-Tournament Team.

From 2014 to 2022, Antetokounmpo played with the senior men's Greek national team in 29 official games, in major FIBA tournaments. In those specific games, he has scored a total of 560 points, for a scoring average of 19.3 points per game. In all senior national team games played, including prep games, which are included in the official stats of national team players, Antetokounmpo has played in a total of 59 games with Greece. In those games, he scored a total of 870 points, for a scoring average of 14.8 points per game.

Player profile

Highly athletic and versatile, Antetokounmpo is often recognized as one of the best all-around players in the NBA, and many analysts have declared him "positionless" and as embodying the future of the league.

Offense
By the 2016–17 season, Antetokounmpo had established himself as one of the league's most devastating slashers and transition scorers. His rare combination of size and speed frequently enables him to cross half a court in a single dribble and blowing past multiple defenders. A 2017 analysis conducted by Stats SportVU at the behest of FiveThirtyEight showed that Antetokounmpo was able to cover slightly more than 15 feet off a single dribble when driving to the basket, 5 feet further than the average player in the league. In addition, Antetokounmpo has developed his own version of the Euro step, described by Jordan Brenner of ESPN.com as "the final phase of the move's evolution", which allows him to directly attack the rim from the three-point arc in a move that "renders the area between the top of the key and the basket all but undefendable".

However, Antetokounmpo has been criticized for his lack of a reliable jump shot, having shot above 31% from three-point range just once in his career. Antetokounmpo's jumper has been exploited by other teams. Most famously, the Toronto Raptors built a 'wall' of lengthy, adept defenders to neutralise Antetokounmpo's paint dominance in their 2019 Conference Finals victory. As a result, Antetokounmpo increased his jump-shooting output, averaging a career-high 4.4 three-point goals attempted and 1.4 made per game in 2019–20.

Antetokounmpo has also received attention for his playmaking skills. Despite not being the primary ball handler of the Bucks, he has largely orchestrated the team's offense. During the 2019–20 season, Antetokounmpo was responsible (through assisting and personally scoring) for 57.8% of the points the Bucks scored while he was on the floor, one of the highest rates in the league. He averaged nearly 6 assists per game during both the 2018–19 and 2019–20 seasons.

Defense
Antetokounmpo is also recognized as an elite defensive player, capable of guarding all five positions but more often deployed in a "free safety" role that allows him to roam the paint and discourage attacks on the rim. He is also a proficient shot-blocker and has developed a reputation for blocking opponents in transition (the chase-down block).
With Antetokounmpo in this role, the Bucks have flourished into one of the league's best defensive teams, leading the NBA in defensive rating in 2018–19 and 2019–20. For his defensive efforts, Antetokounmpo won the 2020 NBA Defensive Player of the Year, and he has become a perennial NBA All-Defensive honoree.

Awards and honors
 NBA Champion: 2021
 NBA Finals MVP: 2021
 2× NBA Most Valuable Player: , 
 NBA Defensive Player of the Year: 
 NBA All-Star Game MVP: 
 NBA Most Improved Player: 
 6× All-NBA Selection:
 All-NBA Second Team: , 
 5× All-Defensive Selection:
 NBA All-Defensive Second Team: 
 NBA All-Rookie Second Team: 
 NBA 75th Anniversary Team: 2021
 EuroBasket Top Scorer: 2022
 EuroBasket All-Tournament Team: 2022
 Euroscar European Player of the Year: 
 Time 100: 
 Best Male Athlete ESPY Award: 2019

Records
Only player in NBA history to finish a regular season in the top 20 in all five statistics of total points, rebounds, assists, steals and blocks.
Only player in NBA history to average at least 25 points, 10.0 rebounds, 5.0 assists, 1.0 steals and 1.0 blocks in multiple seasons.
Only non-American player in NBA history to win the All-Star Game MVP.
Only player in NBA history to have 200 points, 100 rebounds and 50 assists in a playoff series.
Only player in NBA history to average at least 31 points, 14 rebounds and 6 assists in a single postseason.
Highest scoring close-out Finals game in NBA history (50 points): Milwaukee Bucks, 
Tied with Bob Petit (St. Louis Hawks)
Third NBA player to win MVP and Defensive Player of the Year awards in the same season: Milwaukee Bucks, 
Also achieved by Michael Jordan (Chicago Bulls), and Hakeem Olajuwon (Houston Rockets)
Third NBA player to post a 40 points, 20 rebounds and 5 assists game in the playoffs: Milwaukee Bucks, 
Also achieved by Wilt Chamberlain (Philadelphia Warriors) and (Philadelphia 76ers), and Shaquille O'Neal (Los Angeles Lakers)
Fourth NBA player since the NBA-ABA merger to post 30 points, 20 rebounds and 10 assists in a game: Milwaukee Bucks, 
Also achieved by David Lee (New York Knicks), DeMarcus Cousins (New Orleans Pelicans), and Nikola Jokić (Denver Nuggets,  and )
Fifth NBA player to lead his team in all five major statistics (points, rebounds, assists, steals, blocks) in the same season: Milwaukee Bucks, 
Also achieved by Dave Cowens (Boston Celtics), Scottie Pippen (Chicago Bulls), Kevin Garnett (Minnesota Timberwolves, 2002–03) LeBron James (Cleveland Cavaliers), and Nikola Jokić (Denver Nuggets)

Career statistics

NBA

Regular season

|-
| style="text-align:left;"|
| style="text-align:left;"|Milwaukee
| 77 || 23 || 24.6 || .414 || .347 || .683 || 4.4 || 1.9 || .8 || .8 || 6.8
|-
| style="text-align:left;"|
| style="text-align:left;"|Milwaukee
| 81 || 71 || 31.4 || .491 || .159 || .741 || 6.7 || 2.6 || .9 || 1.0 || 12.7
|-
| style="text-align:left;"|
| style="text-align:left;"|Milwaukee
| 80 || 79 || 35.3 || .506 || .257 || .724 || 7.7 || 4.3 || 1.2 || 1.4 || 16.9
|-
| style="text-align:left;"|
| style="text-align:left;"|Milwaukee
| 80 || 80 || 35.6 || .522 || .272 || .770 || 8.7 || 5.4 || 1.6 || 1.9 || 22.9
|-
| style="text-align:left;"|
| style="text-align:left;"|Milwaukee
| 75 || 75 || 36.7 || .529 || .307 || .760 || 10.0 || 4.8 || 1.5 || 1.4 || 26.9
|-
| style="text-align:left;"|
| style="text-align:left;"|Milwaukee
| 72 || 72 || 32.8 || .578 || .256 || .729 || 12.5 || 5.9 || 1.3 || 1.5 || 27.7
|-
| style="text-align:left;"|
| style="text-align:left;"|Milwaukee
| 63 || 63 || 30.4 || .553 || .304 || .633 || 13.6 || 5.6 || 1.0 || 1.0 || 29.5
|-
| style="text-align:left;background:#afe6ba;"|†
| style="text-align:left;"|Milwaukee
| 61 || 61 || 33.0 || .569 || .303 || .685 || 11.0 || 5.9 || 1.2 || 1.2 || 28.1
|-
| style="text-align:left;"|
| style="text-align:left;"|Milwaukee
| 67 || 67 || 32.9 || .553 || .293 || .722 || 11.6 || 5.8 || 1.1 || 1.4 || 29.9
|- class="sortbottom"
| style="text-align:center;" colspan="2"|Career
| 656 || 591 || 32.6 || .535 || .288 || .718 || 9.4 || 4.6 || 1.2 || 1.3 || 21.8
|- class="sortbottom"
| style="text-align:center;" colspan="2"|All-Star
| 7 || 7 || 25.6 || .717 || .316 || .667 || 7.7 || 3.0 || 1.3 || .9 || 25.1

Playoffs

|-
| style="text-align:left;"|2015
| style="text-align:left;"|Milwaukee
| 6 || 6 || 33.5 || .366 || .000 || .739 || 7.0 || 2.7 || .5 || 1.5 || 11.5
|-
| style="text-align:left;"|2017
| style="text-align:left;"|Milwaukee
| 6 || 6 || 40.5 || .536 || .400 || .543 || 9.5 || 4.0 || 2.2 || 1.7 || 24.8
|-
| style="text-align:left;"|2018
| style="text-align:left;"|Milwaukee
| 7 || 7 || 40.0 || .570 || .286 || .691 || 9.6 || 6.3 || 1.4 || .9 || 25.7
|-
| style="text-align:left;"|2019
| style="text-align:left;"|Milwaukee
| 15 || 15 || 34.3 || .492 || .327 || .637 || 12.3 || 4.9 || 1.1 || 2.0 || 25.5
|-
| style="text-align:left;"|2020
| style="text-align:left;"|Milwaukee
| 9 || 9 || 30.8 || .559 || .325 || .580 || 13.8 || 5.7 || .7 || .9 || 26.7
|-
| style="text-align:left;background:#afe6ba;"|2021†
| style="text-align:left;"|Milwaukee
| 21 || 21 || 38.1 || .569 || .186 || .587 || 12.8 || 5.1 || 1.0 || 1.2 || 30.2
|-
| style="text-align:left;"|2022
| style="text-align:left;"|Milwaukee
| 12 || 12 || 37.3 || .491 || .220 || .679 || 14.2 || 6.8 || .7 || 1.3 || 31.7
|- class="sortbottom"
| style="text-align:center;" colspan="2"|Career
| 76 || 76 || 36.3 || .527 || .264 || .626 || 12.0 || 5.2 || 1.0 || 1.4 || 26.8

Outside of basketball 
In August 2022, Calamos Advisors announced that they would work with Antetokounmpo on an exchange-traded fund that invests in sustainable firms that would be called the Calamos Antetokounmpo Sustainable Equities Fund.

In September 2022, Antetokounmpo joined as an executive producer for National Geographic's documentary The Flagmakers, which focuses on the large population of immigrant employees working at an American flag factory. Antetokounmpo called the project inspiring, saying: “As an immigrant myself, I find this film incredibly personal and a deeply moving testament to those who call this country ‘home’”.

Personal life

Antetokounmpo's father, Charles, was a Nigerian football player, while his mother, Veronica, is a former high jumper. Charles died in September 2017, at age 54. Veronica gave each of her five sons both Greek and Nigerian names, choosing the Nigerian Ugo for Giannis. His parents are from different Nigerian ethnic groups—Charles was Yoruba, while Veronica is Igbo. According to basketball great Hakeem Olajuwon, also Yoruba, the original family name of Adetokunbo translates to "the crown has returned from overseas". Giannis wears the number 34 in honor of his parents, who were born in 1963 and 1964.

Antetokounmpo has two older brothers, Francis (Greek name Andreas) and Thanasis, as well as two younger brothers, Kostas and Alex. Antetokounmpo is a Christian and was raised in the Greek Orthodox Church. He was baptized in the Greek Orthodox Church along with his brother Alex on October 28, 2012.

Following their son and brother, the entire Antetokounmpo family, except for Francis and Thanasis, moved from Athens to Milwaukee in early 2014. In July 2016, Giannis and Thanasis began their mandatory military service in Greece. The two brothers served a reduced three-month military service, as prescribed for Greek citizens who are permanent overseas residents.

Thanasis made his NBA debut with the New York Knicks after being drafted by the organization with the 51st overall pick in the 2014 NBA draft. He is now with the Milwaukee Bucks. Antetokounmpo's younger brother, Kostas, played college basketball for Dayton before being selected with the last pick in the 2018 NBA draft. He went on to win the 2020 NBA Championship with the Los Angeles Lakers. In 2021, Kostas signed with ASVEL Basket, part of the French Betclic Élite and the Euroleague. Their youngest brother, Alex, played high school basketball in the US before becoming a professional basketball player.

In February 2020, his girlfriend gave birth to their first son. She gave birth to a second son in August 2021. On March 13, 2020, Antetokounmpo and his family pledged to give $100,000 to the staff of the Fiserv Forum who were unable to work during the suspension of the 2019–20 NBA season because of the COVID-19 pandemic. Antetokounmpo and his family also donated 20,000 masks to people in Athens and Zografou in Greece in 2020.

On August 20, 2021, Antetokounmpo became a minority owner of the Milwaukee Brewers of Major League Baseball. Antetokounmpo also holds a passion for soccer, being a supporter of Italian football club Inter Milan. In March 2023, Giannis, along with his brothers, Alex, Thanasis, and Kostas, became minority owners in the Major League Soccer club Nashville SC.

See also
 List of National Basketball Association franchise career scoring leaders
 List of National Basketball Association single-game playoff scoring leaders
 List of oldest and youngest National Basketball Association players
 List of National Basketball Association career triple-double leaders
 List of European basketball players in the United States
 Milwaukee Bucks draft history

Explanatory notes

References

External links

 Giannis Antetokounmpo at basket.gr 
 
 

1994 births
Living people
2014 FIBA Basketball World Cup players
2019 FIBA Basketball World Cup players
Antetokounmpo family
Eastern Orthodox Christians from Greece
EFAO Zografou B.C. players
Greek expatriate basketball people in the United States
Greek expatriate sportspeople in the United States
Greek men's basketball players
Greek people of Igbo descent
Greek people of Nigerian descent
Greek people of Yoruba descent
Igbo sportspeople
Milwaukee Bucks draft picks
Milwaukee Bucks players
National Basketball Association All-Stars
National Basketball Association players from Greece
Naturalized citizens of Greece
Naturalized citizens of the United States
Nigerian emigrants to the United States
Power forwards (basketball)
Small forwards
Basketball players from Athens
Yoruba sportspeople